Language Computer Corporation (LCC) is a natural language processing research company based in Richardson, Texas.  The company develops a variety of natural language processing products, including software for question answering, information extraction, and automatic summarization.

Since its founding in 1995, the low-profile company has landed significant United States Government contracts, with $8,353,476 in contracts in 2006-2008.

While the company has focused primarily on the government software market, LCC has also used its technology to spin off three start-up companies.  The first spin-off, known as Lymba Corporation, markets the PowerAnswer question answering product originally developed at LCC.  In 2010, LCC's CEO, Andrew Hickl, co-founded two start-ups which made use of the company's technology.  These included Swingly, an automatic question answering start-up, and Extractiv, an information extraction service that was founded in partnership with Houston, Texas-based 80legs.

References

External links
 Language Computer Corporation website
 Lymba Corporation website

Software companies based in Texas
Companies based in Richardson, Texas
Natural language processing
Computational linguistics
Semantic Web companies
Software companies of the United States